Kabarole District is a district in Western Uganda. Kabarole District is part of the Kingdom of Toro. Its main town was Fort Portal before 1st July 2020 when it was elevated to a city, separating it from Kabarole district Government.
The new Kabarole district seat is proporsed in Busoro Town Council.
Kabarole remains with only one county (Burahya). Bunyangabu county was curved out to form Bunyangabu district in 2017. Fort Portal Municipality constituency became Fort Portal City in 2020 with an independent local Government.

Location
The coordinates of the district are:00 36N, 30 18E (Latitude:0.6000; Longitude:30.3000). The surface area is 1,814 km2.

Overview
Kabarole Districts consists of one city and One county:

(a) Fort Portal City and (b) Buryahya County. Bunyangabu District which was one of the three counties of Kabarole District got a district started effective 1 July 2017 leaving Kabarole District with just two counties.

Population
In 1991, the national census put the population of the district at about 299,600. During the 2002 national census, the district population was about 357,000. In 2012, the population of Kabarole District was estimated at about 415,600.

Ethnicities
The Batoro, Batuku and Basongora ethnicities constitute about 52% of the population. The Bakiga constitute 28%, followed by the Bakonjo and the Bamba. The major languages spoken in the district are Rutooro, Rukiga and Runyankore.

Economic activities
Subsistence agriculture and animal husbandry are the main economic activities in Kabarole District.

The crops grown in Kabarole District include:

 Soybeans
 Onions/Obutunguru
 Cassava/Muhoogo
 Bananas/Ebyenju
 Matooke (green bananas)/Ebitooke
 Maize/Ebicooli
 Beans/Ebihimba
 Sorghum/Omugusa
 Potatoes/Ebilaya
 Sweet potatoes/Ebitakuli
 Groundnuts/Ebinyobwa
 Millet/Oburo
 Yams/Ebinyonga
 Coffee/Omwani
 Tea/Amajani
 Pineapples/Enanasi
 Tomatoes/Enyanya
 Cabbage

Livestock is the second economic activity practiced in the district. In 2005, there were approximately 18,695 heads of exotic/cross bred cattle, 35,199 indigenous cattle, 75,897 goats, 6,442 sheep, 12,162 pigs, 9,776 exotic/cross bred chicken, 131,255 local chicken, 4,467 ducks, 1,040 turkeys, 326 guinea fowl, and 122 geese in the district.

Commercial fishing occurs on about 30 of the 52 crater lakes, scattered in Kabarole District. The main fish species harvested from the crater lakes is the small Haplochromines (Nkejje). Fishing, mainly of Protopterus aethiopicus (Lung fish), is also carried out in a number of wetlands. Some fishing also goes on in the area rivers including:

 River Kayagi
 River Kaija
 River Kahomba,
 River Sogohi
 River Muzizi
 River Rwimi
 River Kakoko
 River Kakule
 River Kabago,
 River Kizikibi
 River Yerya

Aquaculture is practiced with increasing frequency in the district and in 2005 there were over 300 fish ponds stocked with tilapia and mirror carp species.

See also
 Fort Portal
 Toro Kingdom
 Toro sub-region
 Western Region, Uganda
 Districts of Uganda

References

External links
 Kabarole District Information Portal

 
Districts of Uganda